Javontae Hawkins (born November 13, 1993) is an American professional basketball player who last played for Telekom Baskets Bonn of the German Basketball Bundesliga and the Basketball Champions League. He played his first two years of college basketball with the South Florida Bulls. Hawkins later played also with Eastern Kentucky and Fordham before going undrafted in the 2017 NBA draft.

High school career
Hawkins was a Four-star prospect and the  No. 89 overall player in the 2012 class. He earned First Team all-state honors as a junior in Michigan while playing at Powers Catholic High School. He spent two years at Huntington Prep in Huntington, West Virginia, where he averaged 17.5 points and 3.5 rebounds per game. Hawkins was also ranked 16th at his position by ESPN and No. 96 overall by CBS Sports Network.

College career
As a freshman at South Florida in 2012–13, Hawkins averaged 4.5 points and 1.6 rebounds per game. As a sophomore, he didn't made a good season and the following season he was transferred to Eastern Kentucky. He sat out the 2014–15 season due to the NCAA transfer rules during his junior year campaign he averaged 17.0 points 5.0 rebounds and almost 3 assists, this earned him 2nd team all OVC. For his final season, he played with Fordham where he was 1st in points (14.0), second in rebounds (4.9). Scored his 1,000 collegiate points in a double OT win against VCU.

Professional career

Vilpas (2017–2018) 
After going undrafted in the 2017 NBA draft, Hawkins joined the Vilpas Vikings of the Korisliiga. With Vilpas, he went on to average 14.3 points 4.3 rebounds and 1.1 assists per game.

Holargos (2018–2019) 
On July 13, 2018, Hawkins joined Holargos of the Greek Basket League.

Crailsheim Merlins (2019–2020) 
On August 3, 2019, Hawkins signed with Crailsheim Merlins of the Basketball Bundesliga. Hawkins averaged 15.9 points per game shooting 53% from the floor.

Telekom Baskets Bonn (2021–2022) 
Hawkins signed with Riesen Ludwigsburg on July 27, 2020, but tore a cruciate ligament in his knee during the preseason. The tear ended up being a season-ending injury. On December 16, 2021, Hawkins signed with Telekom Baskets Bonn.

Limoges CSP (2022–2023) 
On July 18, 2022, he has signed with Limoges CSP of the LNB Pro A.

Telekom Baskets Bonn (2023–present) 
On February 1, 2023, he signed with Telekom Baskets Bonn of the German Basketball Bundesliga and the Basketball Champions League.

References

External links
RealGM.com profile
Nbadraft.net profile
ESPN.com profile 
Fordham Rams bio

1993 births
Living people
American expatriate basketball people in Germany
American expatriate basketball people in Greece
American expatriate basketball people in Finland
American men's basketball players
Basketball players from Flint, Michigan
Crailsheim Merlins players
Eastern Kentucky Colonels men's basketball players
Fordham Rams men's basketball players
Holargos B.C. players
Limoges CSP players
Shooting guards
Small forwards
South Florida Bulls men's basketball players
Telekom Baskets Bonn players